Dudleya abramsii subsp. setchellii, known by common name as the Santa Clara Valley dudleya or Santa Clara Valley liveforever, is a member of the Dudleya genus of succulent perennials, members of the family Crassulaceae. The Santa Clara Valley dudleya, endemic to the Santa Clara Valley region in the southern San Francisco Bay Area, was listed on 3 February 1995, as an endangered species. It is considered to be a subspecies of Dudleya abramsii, but its taxonomic status is still unclear. Its closest relative is Dudleya cymosa subsp. paniculata, which is a morphologically similar sister taxon.

Description
A perennial rosette-forming succulent, this species is characterized by pale yellow petals, a simple (not branching multiple times) inflorescence, and a restriction to serpentine soil.

Morphology 
The stems may branch dichotomously to form 1 to 5 rosettes. The leaves are shaped oblong-triangular to lance-elliptic to lanceolate, and have a glaucous surface.

There are typically 2 to 3 first degree branches on the inflorescence, which are oriented in an ascending fashion and usually do not bifurcate further. The lower parts of the petals are fused  the way up to form a tube. The petals are colored a pale yellow.

Taxonomy 

Dudleya abramsii subsp. setchellii has undergone numerous changes in its taxonomic classification. Originally placed a subspecies of Cotyledon laxa / Echeveria laxa, an antiquated synonym for Dudleya caespitosa, botanists Nathaniel Lord Britton and Joseph Nelson Rose placed it as a separate species within Dudleya in 1903. In a 1957 issue of Madroño, botanist Reid Moran revised setchellii as a subspecies of Dudleya cymosa. Cotyledon caespitosa var. paniculata, now Dudleya cymosa subsp. paniculata, was merged into setchellii. Almost half a century later, Moran and other botanists returned to setchellii, and again revised it as a subspecies of Dudleya abramsii.

It is visually similar to and sometimes indistinguishable from Dudleya cymosa subsp. paniculata. Recent phylogenetic analysis may in fact place setchellii back into a subspecies of D. cymosa, as it is most closely related to D. c. subsp. paniculata. Reid Moran, who combined it back into D. abramsii, suggests that it owes a superficial resemblance to Dudleya abramsii subsp. murina.

Distribution
Dudleya abramsii subsp. setchellii is found only in the Coyote Valley area of southern Santa Clara County, California, mostly on rocky outcrops within serpentine grasslands on Tulare Hill and the Santa Teresa Hills west of Coyote Creek in south San Jose and south of Metcalf Canyon east of Coyote Creek.

Gallery

See also 

 Dudleya cymosa subsp. paniculata
 Dudleya abramsii subsp. abramsii
 Dudleya farinosa

References

External links
Jepson Manual Treatment – Dudleya setchellii
USDA Plants Profile: Dudleya setchellii
Dudleya setchellii – Photo gallery

abramsii setchellii
Endemic flora of California
Natural history of the California chaparral and woodlands
Natural history of Santa Clara County, California
Taxa named by Willis Linn Jepson
Endemic flora of the San Francisco Bay Area
Taxa named by Reid Venable Moran